Midwest FurFest (MFF) is a furry convention that takes place in Rosemont, Illinois, usually on the second weekend after Thanksgiving. MFF is an Illinois Educational Not-For-Profit Corporation that exists primarily for the purpose of holding an annual convention to facilitate education in anthropomorphic literature and art. It also facilitates the donation of funds to non-profit institutions, mainly of which promote the well-being of humans and/or animals. The convention was first held in 2000 and has grown to draw 13,641 attendees in 2022. , the 2022 event is the most attended convention in fandom history.

Background and history

Midwest FurFest started as the furry track for DucKon, a Chicago-based science fiction convention. The furry track was started at DucKon 3 in 1994 and was headed up by Robert King. The track grew larger each year and it was estimated that by DucKon 8 (1999) between one-quarter and one-third of the attendees were there due to interest in the furry track.

The track ran into problems because it was running out of room to expand without costing other parts of DucKon programming space and time. It was decided that the best course of action was to spin off into a new convention.

Midwest Furry Fandom, Inc. was created, and Midwest FurFest's first occurrence took place in November 2000, on the weekend before Thanksgiving. MFF left DucKon on good terms; DucKon provided funding to help the convention's first year.

The convention has grown from 473 attendees in 2000 to 13,641 in 2022, making it the largest furry convention in the world by more than 3,900 attendees over the previous largest convention, Anthrocon. It has helped raise over $767,000 for various charities.

Incidents and controversies

2014 gas attack

On December 7, 2014, a gas leak occurred at the Hyatt hotel in Rosemont, which was accommodating attendees. The hotel was evacuated, and 19 guests were hospitalized. Later, an investigation found a broken glass bottle containing a concentration of chlorine powder inside the building. 18 of the 19 people hospitalized were released soon after and the convention continued. Rosemont Police interviewed hotel guests and employees, as well as employees at local stores which sell chlorine. While these interviews and subsequent investigation did not result in any known suspects or charges, police continue to treat this as a crime.

Milo Yiannopoulos
On September 15, 2019, Milo Yiannopoulos announced his intention to attend that year's convention. After significant backlash from other attendees on social media, Yiannopoulos was swiftly banned from the convention the following day.

Locations, attendances, and charity donations by year

References

External links
 

Conventions in Illinois
Furry conventions
Recurring events established in 2000